Tampa Film Festival may refer to:
 Gasparilla Film Festival
 India International Film Festival of Tampa Bay
 Tampa Bay Jewish Film Festival
 Tampa International Gay and Lesbian Film Festival